Shai is an American vocal R&B/soul quartet, most popular in the 1990s. The group met and formed on the campus of Howard University.

Their most successful hit was "If I Ever Fall in Love", which reached No. 2 on the Billboard Hot 100.

Music career 
Shai released "If I Ever Fall in Love" as the first single from the debut album of the same title, which peaked at No. 2 in the U.S. The next two releases from the platinum album, "Comforter" and "Baby I'm Yours", each peaked at No. 10 in the U.S. The group's next album release was Right Back at Cha, a remix album that largely consisted of new versions of their previous hits, and a couple of new songs. A completely reworked version of their previous hit "Baby I'm Yours", simply titled "Yours", was released as a single (US No. 63).

In 1994, Shai released "The Place Where You Belong", from the Beverly Hills Cop III soundtrack. It was the group's final Top 40 single (No. 32 R&B). In late 1995, their follow-up album Blackface was released (No. 42 Pop & No. 15 R&B). It featured their final R&B Top 20 single "Come with Me" (US No. 43). The 1996 remix, "I Don't Wanna Be Alone" (featuring Jay-Z), peaked at No. 89 in the U.S. It was inspired by Belinda Carlisle's "Heaven Is a Place on Earth".

"Song For You" by Rick Braun, featuring Shai, peaked at No. 39 on the R&B chart in 2001.

Discography

Albums and EPs 
 ...If I Ever Fall in Love (1992) – US No. 6 & US R&B No. 3 (platinum)
 Right Back at Cha (1993) – US No. 127 & US R&B No. 42 
 Blackface (1995) – US No. 42 & US R&B No. 15 
 Destiny (1999)
 Back from the Mystery System: The Love Cycle (2004)
 Love Cycle: Back from the Mystery System (2007)
 Worldwide (as D-n-G of Shai) (2008)
 Musically Yours (2018)

Compilations 
 20th Century Masters – The Millennium Collection: The Best of Shai (2001)
 If I Ever Fall in Love: The Best Of (3 re-recorded tracks from the original album) (2011)
 If I Ever Fall in Love: Greatest Hits (same 3 tracks re-recorded with new members Dwayne Jones & George Spencer III) (2011)
 In Concert (2018)

Singles

Filmography 
 Video Personification: Vol. 1 (1993)

References 

American contemporary R&B musical groups
African-American musical groups
MCA Records artists
American boy bands
Musical groups from Washington, D.C.
Musical groups established in 1992